Carmelo Algarañaz Añez (born 27 January 1996) is a Bolivian footballer who plays in Bolivian Primera División for Club Always Ready as a striker.

He made his full debut for Bolivia on 29 May 2016, against the USA.

References

External links
 

Living people
Bolivian footballers
Bolivian Primera División players
Bolivia international footballers
Association football forwards
Oriente Petrolero players
Club Petrolero players
Sport Boys Warnes players
Club Always Ready players
Sportspeople from Santa Cruz de la Sierra
1996 births